SkyDeck may refer to:
 Berkeley SkyDeck, a business startup incubator program at the University of California, Berkeley
 SkyDeck Music, an American a record label and print publisher
 Skydeck, a tourist attraction at the Willis Tower in Chicago, Illinois